IFB may refer to:
 Illinois Farm Bureau
 Independent Fundamental Baptist, Independent Baptist Christian congregations
 Institute of Forest Biodiversity, Indian research agency
 International Freedom Battalion in the Syrian Civil War started in 2011
 Interruptible foldback (or interruptible feedback), electronic monitoring in TV and filmmaking
 Instituto Federal de Brasília (Federal Institute of Brasília), an institute of technology in  Brazil
 Irish Film Board (now Fís Éireann/Screen Ireland), Irish film production agency
 IFB Home Appliances, India
 Independent Forward Bloc, a political party in Mauritius
 Invitation for bid, a formal letter for generating competing proposals